Brickfield Hill is a City of Sydney locality in inner city Sydney, Australia. The name was used for the surrounding settlement serving the colony's growing need for bricks, and today is part of the suburb of Surry Hills.

History

Brickfield Hill was a Sydney postal address until postcodes were introduced in 1967, and roughly covered the area between Sydney Town Hall and Central Station. The area was used for brick-making, hence the term, up until the 1840s when land values rose and merchant stores, warehouses, and housing became more prominent, although the area remained a relatively poor 'slum' area of the city. In 1905, following the destruction of their Haymarket store by fire in 1901, Anthony Hordern & Sons opened their new "Palace Emporium" on Brickfield Hill, the construction of which involved the demolition of several houses including Samuel Hordern's birthplace. Following the demise of the Hordern retailing empire, the building was used by the New South Wales Institute of Technology Faculty of Business and later also Faculty of Law, from 1967-1984. The building was controversially demolished in 1985–1986 and was eventually replaced by the World Square development.

See also
Jack Lang, 23rd Premier of New South Wales, was born in Brickfield Hill in 1876.
 Brickfielder, the hot wind, takes its name from Brickfield Hill
Devonshire Street Cemetery, incorrectly known as Brickfield Hill Cemetery as it was located in this area.
Athenaeum Theatre, Sydney, short-lived entertainment venue at 610 George Street

References

External links
 Brickmaking in early Sydney
 The Old Sydney Burial Ground

Sydney localities